László Klausz (born 24 June 1971) is a Hungarian football coach and a former player. He is the manager of Tiszakécske FC.

International career
He was a member of the Hungary national football team from 1993 to 2000.

International goals

Coaching career
Klausz signed a two-year contract as a manager of Győri ETO on 2 June 2021.

References

External links

1971 births
Living people
Hungarian footballers
Hungary international footballers
Hungarian expatriate footballers
Expatriate footballers in Austria
Expatriate footballers in France
Expatriate footballers in Germany
FC Tatabánya players
Győri ETO FC players
FC Red Bull Salzburg players
FC Sochaux-Montbéliard players
SV Waldhof Mannheim players
SW Bregenz players
Nemzeti Bajnokság I players
Austrian Football Bundesliga players
Ligue 1 players
2. Bundesliga players
Association football forwards
Hungarian football managers
Pénzügyőr SE managers
Győri ETO FC managers